Overland Trails is a 1948 American Western film directed by Lambert Hillyer and written by Adele Buffington. The film stars Johnny Mack Brown, Raymond Hatton, Virginia Belmont, Bill Kennedy, Virginia Carroll and Mike Ragan. The film was released on January 31, 1948 by Monogram Pictures.

Plot

Cast          
Johnny Mack Brown as Johnny Murdock
Raymond Hatton as Dusty Hanover
Virginia Belmont as Marcia Brandon
Bill Kennedy as Carter Morgan
Virginia Carroll as Mary Cramer
Mike Ragan as Rex Hillman 
Ted Adams as Matt Cramer
Steve Darrell as Marc Brandon
Lanny Rees as Bud Cramer 
Carl Mathews as Steve Tully
Milburn Morante as Brooks
Bob Woodward as Ed 
Boyd Stockman as Joe 
George Peters as Paul

References

External links
 

1948 films
American Western (genre) films
1948 Western (genre) films
Monogram Pictures films
Films directed by Lambert Hillyer
American black-and-white films
1940s English-language films
1940s American films